Beyond Survival is a Canadian documentary television show hosted by survival expert Les Stroud.

Episodes

See also
 Survivorman, TV series starring Les Stroud
 Survive This, TV series hosted by Les Stroud

References

External links
 Beyond Survival webpage at Les Stroud's Official Website
 Beyond Survival webpage at The Discovery Channel
 Original Air Dates for Beyond Survival
 

2010s Canadian reality television series
2010 Canadian television series debuts
2010 Canadian television series endings
2010s Canadian documentary television series
Works about survival skills
OLN original programming
Canadian travel television series
Nature educational television series
Discovery Channel (Canada) original programming